Theodore Lyman IV (November 23, 1874 – October 11, 1954) was a U.S. physicist and spectroscopist, born in Boston. He graduated from Harvard in 1897, from which he also received his Ph.D. in 1900.

Career
Lyman became an assistant professor in physics at Harvard, where he remained, becoming full professor in 1917, and where he was also director of the Jefferson Physical Laboratory (1908–17). He made important studies in phenomena connected with diffraction gratings, on the wavelengths of vacuum ultraviolet light discovered by Victor Schumann and also on the properties of light of extremely short wavelength, on all of which he contributed valuable papers to the literature of physics in the proceedings of scientific societies.

Military service
During World War I he served in France with the American Expeditionary Force, holding the rank of major of engineers.

Legacy/honors

 He was the eponym of the Lyman series of spectral lines. 
 The crater  Lyman on the far side of the Moon is named after him. 
 He was awarded the Franklin Institute's Elliott Cresson Medal in 1931.
 The Lyman Laboratory of Physics at Harvard University is named after him.

Affiliations
He became a hereditary member of the Military Order of the Loyal Legion of the United States in succession to his father, Lieutenant Colonel Theodore Lyman III.

References
 
USGS Gazetteer of Planetary Nomenclature Feature Information
1931 Frederic Ives Medal

External links
National Academy of Sciences Biographical Memoir

1874 births
1954 deaths
United States Army officers
American military personnel of World War I
Military personnel from Massachusetts
Harvard University faculty
Harvard University alumni
People from Boston
American physicists
Optical physicists
Spectroscopists
Hollis Chair of Mathematics and Natural Philosophy
Members of the United States National Academy of Sciences
Presidents of the American Physical Society